Lágrimas negras is a Mexican telenovela produced by  Valentín Pimstein for Televisa in 1979.

Cast 
Irma Lozano
Gaston Tuset as Marques de Alvear
Nubia Marti as Eugenia
Salvador Pineda
Maritza Olivares
Gloria Marin
Lucy Gallardo

References

External links 

Mexican telenovelas
1979 telenovelas
Televisa telenovelas
Spanish-language telenovelas
1979 Mexican television series debuts
1979 Mexican television series endings